Boswyn is a hamlet in west Cornwall, England, United Kingdom, approximately one mile south of Troon. It is in the civil parish of Camborne.

References

Hamlets in Cornwall